Anoia is a comune in the Metropolitan City of Reggio Calabria, Calabria (southern Italy) It is bordered by Melicucco and Primogenito to the southwest, Maropati to the northeast and Cinquefrondi to the southeast. Anoia is formed by two separate settlements, the frazioni of Anoia Inferiore and Anoi Superiore, the latter located about c. 800 m to the southeast of the other along the SS536 road between Cinquefrondi and Maropati.

References

External links
Official website

Cities and towns in Calabria